Janet Land (born 1956) is a Canadian film and television actress. She has acted in episodes of TV shows, including Goosebumps and Mayday, and several movies, including Silent Hill.

Filmography

Film

Television

External links
 
 https://web.archive.org/web/20071125154808/http://www.actratoronto.com/conference13/bios13.html

1956 births
Canadian television actresses
Living people